SuperBrawl was an annual professional wrestling pay-per-view (PPV) event in World Championship Wrestling (WCW) held in May 1991 and February from 1992 through 2001. Along with Starrcade, Bash at the Beach, The Great American Bash, and Halloween Havoc, SuperBrawl was booked to be one of WCW's flagship pay-per-views. The first SuperBrawl was held in May, but from 1992 onward it was held in February to coincide with the Super Bowl, which inspired the SuperBrawl name. Events from 1992 to 1999 were identified by Roman numerals in its logo and announced on-screen with its corresponding number. The final installment in 2001 was the penultimate WCW PPV as the organization folded a month later. Sting holds the record for most appearances at the pay-per-view with eight. In 2015, all WCW pay-per-views were made available on the WWE Network. 

The trademark was owned by the WWE after it bought the promotion's intellectual properties in March 2001 and expired in 2005. Cody Rhodes subsequently filed to claim the SuperBrawl trademark in November 2019. In November 2020, a settlement was reached between Cody Rhodes and WWE in which Cody gained the "Cody Rhodes" trademark, which WWE had held onto after his run in that company, in exchange for WWE gaining the WCW event name trademarks that Cody had claimed, including SuperBrawl.

A Super NES video game named after the event, titled WCW SuperBrawl Wrestling, was released in 1994.

SuperBrawl dates and venues

References